In enzymology, an ubiquitin-calmodulin ligase is an enzyme that catalyzes the chemical reaction

n ATP + calmodulin + n ubiquitin  n AMP + n diphosphate + (ubiquitin)n-calmodulin

The 3 substrates of this enzyme are ATP, calmodulin, and ubiquitin, whereas its 3 products are AMP, diphosphate, and (ubiquitin)n-calmodulin.

This enzyme belongs to the family of ligases, specifically those forming carbon-nitrogen bonds as acid-D-amino-acid ligases (peptide synthases).  The systematic name of this enzyme class is calmodulin:ubiquitin ligase (AMP-forming). Other names in common use include ubiquityl-calmodulin synthase, ubiquitin-calmodulin synthetase, ubiquityl-calmodulin synthetase, and uCaM-synthetase.

References

 
 

EC 6.3.2
Enzymes of unknown structure